Sterling Congregational Church is a historic church in Sterling Township, Blue Earth County, Minnesota, United States, built in 1867.  It was listed on the National Register of Historic Places in 1980.  It was nominated for being a rare surviving example of rural community buildings from the settlement era prior to the county's first railroad.

References

Churches completed in 1867
Churches in Blue Earth County, Minnesota
Congregational churches in Minnesota
Greek Revival church buildings in Minnesota
Churches on the National Register of Historic Places in Minnesota
Wooden churches in Minnesota
National Register of Historic Places in Blue Earth County, Minnesota
1867 establishments in Minnesota